EUC refers to End-user certificate

It may also refer to:

Education
 Erasmus University College, in Rotterdam, Netherlands
 Etisalat University College, former private college in Sharjah, United Arab Emirates
 EUC Nord, a school system in Denmark
 European University Centre, of Nancy 2 University
 European University Cyprus, in Nicosia, Cyprus

Computing
 End-user computing
 Extended Unix Code, a character encoding

Organizations
 Eravur Urban Council, a local authority in Sri Lanka
 European Union Committee, of the House of Lords in the Parliament of the United Kingdom
 European Universities Championships

Places
 Eucla Airport, in Western Australia

Other uses
 Electrolytes, urea, creatinine, a blood test
 Emergency Unemployment Compensation
 End-user certificate
 Equipment under control in the IEC 61508 standard
 Electric unicycle, see Self-balancing unicycle
 Excellent Used Condition